Japji Khaira is an Australian actress and model. She won the title 'Miss World Punjaban 2006' held on 16 December at Ludhiana,  becoming the first non-Indian of Punjabi origin to win this title.

Career
After winning the title of Miss World Punjaban, Japji Khaira  made her debut in the movie Mitti Wajaan Maardi (2007) opposite Harbhajan Maan. She was in Fer Mamla Gadbad Gadbad in the lead role. She had a cameo role in Dharti (2011). She also appeared in Singh vs Kaur.

Filmography

Films

Music Videos

References

Living people
1988 births
Actresses from Ludhiana
Indian emigrants to Australia
Australian film actresses
Australian female models
Punjabi people
Australian people of Indian Punjabi descent
Australian actresses of Indian descent
Australian expatriate actresses in India
Actresses in Punjabi cinema
21st-century Australian actresses